Animal Bar is a brand of chocolate bar, made by Nestlé in the United Kingdom.

Overview 
Animal Bar was launched in 1963, in the UK, by Nestlé. Unlike Milkybar it was never made by the Rowntree Mackintosh Confectionery. They are primarily marketed and made for children. Each Animal Bar contains a game inside of the wrapper, and has two different animals, along with their names; moulded onto the surface of the chocolate. Animal Bars were especially popular during the 1960s and 1970s, thus many adults who were children at that time remember them fondly. They are still sold to this day, in either a single 19 gram bar (for £0.25), or a four-pack of these for £1.00.

The original bars had numerous animal heads molded on them, not just two.

Animals available
There are a total of nine animals that can possibly be on Animal Bars:

 Antelope
 Monkey
 Parrot 
 Iguana
 Lion
 Bear
 Leopard 
 Zebra
 Rhino
 Dog
 Deer

Some people have also had deer on their Animal Bars, but they are rare.

See also
 Kinder Surprise
 Kinder Chocolate
 Smarties
 Aero
 Yorkie

References

External links
 

1963 establishments in the United Kingdom
Rowntree's brands
Chocolate bars
Brand name confectionery